Michael Chaves is an American film director, screenwriter, visual effects artist, editor, and executive producer best known for his work on the miniseries Chase Champion and the theatrical films The Curse of La Llorona and The Conjuring: The Devil Made Me Do It.

Career 
Chaves began directing several short films including The Maiden, which won the Best Super Short Horror Film Award at Shriekfest 2016. He also created the television series Chase Champion, and directed all of the episodes.

He transitioned to feature-length filmmaking with horror films The Curse of La Llorona, The Conjuring: The Devil Made Me Do It, and The Nun 2, all produced by James Wan, which are the sixth, eighth, and ninth installments of The Conjuring Universe, respectively. He is also signed on to direct another horror film, The Reckoning, for Michael Bay, Bradley Fuller, and Andrew Form, under Platinum Dunes, with a script written by Patrick Melton and Marcus Dunstan.

Music video(s)

Filmography 
Short film

Film
 The Curse of La Llorona (2019)
 The Conjuring: The Devil Made Me Do It (2021)
 The Nun 2 (2023)

Web series

References

External links 
 

21st-century American male writers
21st-century American screenwriters
American film directors
American screenwriters
English-language film directors
Horror film directors
Living people
Place of birth missing (living people)
Showrunners
Year of birth missing (living people)